Robert de Clari (or Cléry, the modern name of the place, on the commune of Pernois) was a knight from Picardy. He participated in the Fourth Crusade with his lord, Count Peter of Amiens, and his brother, Aleaumes de Clari, and left a chronicle of the events in Old French. Robert's account of the crusade is especially valuable because of his status as a lower vassal; most other eyewitness accounts are from the leadership of the crusade, like Villehardouin. Robert's descriptions often shed light on some of the crusader activities that are otherwise glossed over by the higher rank sources.

Brother Aleaumes
Robert's brother, Aleaumes, was an armed cleric who distinguished himself during the final siege of Constantinople, when the usurping emperor Alexius V "Murzuphlus" Ducas was routed by the crusaders. Robert included in his chronicle a brief account of his brother's apparently foolhardy bravery during the final capture of the city, when Aleaumes was the first man within the walls, and later mentioned a dispute concerning the division of spoils which Aleaumes deserved. One of the prominent noble leaders of the crusade, Count Hugh of Saint-Pol, judged in favor of Aleaumes.

Shroud of Turin
Robert may be one of the few documented witnesses to the Shroud of Turin before 1358. He reports (1203) that the cloth was in Constantinople, in the church of Blachernae: "Where there was the Shroud in which our Lord had been wrapped, which every Friday raised itself upright so one could see the figure of our Lord on it." The historians Madden and Queller describe this part of Robert's account as a mistake: Robert had actually seen or heard of the sudarium, the handkerchief of Saint Veronica (which also purportedly contained the image of Jesus), and confused it with the grave cloth (sindon). As there is no mention of this "shroud" in any other source, the historian Andrea Nicolotti suggests that Robert’s account is quite a confused description of the famous miracle that occurred every Friday in the church of Blachernae: the so-called “habitual miracle”, that consisted in the prodigious elevation of a cloth before an icon of the Virgin.

The Conquest of Constantinople
Clari wrote an account of the Fourth Crusade which follows the Crusade until 1205. Clari, who was a poor knight, provides the view of the rank and file and although he was not privy to the discussions of the leadership he does provide camp rumours and the reality of the combat. Clari   viewed the Byzantines as treacherous and had a favourable view of the Venetians.

References
Robert de Clari. La Conquête de Constantinople (1924) edited by Philippe Lauer
The Conquest of Constantinople (1996 reprint) translator Edgar Holmes McNeal
 Cristian Bratu, « Je, auteur de ce livre »: L’affirmation de soi chez les historiens, de l’Antiquité à la fin du Moyen Âge. Later Medieval Europe Series (vol. 20). Leiden: Brill, 2019.
 Cristian Bratu, “Je, aucteur de ce livre: Authorial Persona and Authority in French Medieval Histories and Chronicles.”  In Authorities in the Middle Ages. Influence, Legitimacy and Power in Medieval Society. Sini Kangas, Mia Korpiola, and Tuija Ainonen, eds. (Berlin/New York: De Gruyter, 2013): 183-204.
 Cristian Bratu, “Clerc, Chevalier, Aucteur: The Authorial Personae of French Medieval Historians from the 12th to the 15th centuries.” In Authority and Gender in Medieval and Renaissance Chronicles. Juliana Dresvina and Nicholas Sparks, eds. (Newcastle upon Tyne: Cambridge Scholars Publishing, 2012): 231-259.

Notes

12th-century births
13th-century deaths
Christians of the Fourth Crusade
French chroniclers
13th-century French historians
French male writers
12th-century French people 
Medieval French knights
French memoirists